Frank Joseph Kush (January 20, 1929 – June 22, 2017) was an American football player and coach. He served as the head coach at Arizona State University from 1958 to 1979, compiling a record of 176–54–1. Kush was also the head coach of the Canadian Football League (CFL)'s Hamilton Tiger-Cats in 1981, the National Football League (NFL)'s Baltimore/Indianapolis Colts from 1982 to 1984, and the Arizona Outlaws of the United States Football League (USFL) in 1985. He was inducted into the College Football Hall of Fame as a coach in 1995. Kush is of Polish descent and was inducted into the National Polish-American Sports Hall of Fame.

Early life and playing career
Kush was born in Windber, Pennsylvania. He played three years as a 5'7", 160-pound defensive lineman at Michigan State University from 1950 to 1952, earning All-American honors in 1952 helping the Spartans capture a national championship in his last season.

College coaching career
After a stint in the United States Army, where Kush rose to the rank of first lieutenant as he coached the Fort Benning football team, he accepted an assistant coaching position at what was then Arizona State College under former assistant Spartan coach Dan Devine. When Devine left in 1958 to become the head coach at the University of Missouri, Kush was promoted to the position, which he would hold for the next 22 years.

During his time at Arizona State, Kush was known for being one of the most physically demanding coaches in the game. He was notorious for abusing his players both physically and emotionally. His daily football practices in the heat of the Arizona desert are still the stuff of legend today. One of his drills was known as "Bull in the Ring", whereupon he would have the players form a circle. He would put a player in the middle (most often, a player he felt needed "motivation"), call out a uniform number, and blow his whistle. That player would charge the player in the middle and the two would engage in contact until Kush blew the whistle again. Whichever of the two players gave the best effort would go back to the circle, while the player "dogging it" would stay in until Kush decided he could quit. Former NFL and Arizona State player Curley Culp once broke a teammate's facemask during this drill.

Another of his drills consisted of having only a center, quarterback, and two running backs line up on offense, with no other offensive lineman, and run running plays against the entire defense. Kush would run a running back into the line time and time again so he could get used to the punishment he would likely take in games.
Many observers saw Kush's personality and behavior as an effort to compensate for his short stature.
The most famous of Kush's motivational techniques was called "Mount Kush." Mount Kush was a steep hill near Camp Tontozona, the Sun Devils' training camp near Payson. It featured several large rocks, cacti, and no shade from the Arizona sun. If Kush felt a player especially needed discipline, that player would have to run up and down that hill numerous times.

During his lengthy career in the desert, Kush compiled a record of 176–54–1, with only one losing season. In his first eleven years, he captured two conference titles and finished runnerup five times. That success led to him accepting the head coaching job at the University of Pittsburgh on January 4, 1969. However, just five days later, Kush had a change of heart and returned to Arizona State.

Kush's return would begin a memorable era in Sun Devil football history. The Sun Devils won five consecutive Western Athletic Conference championships from 1969 to 1973, going 50–6 in conference play during this time. During this time, Arizona State won the 1970 Peach Bowl and the first three editions of the Fiesta Bowl. In 1974, the team dropped to 7–5, but bounced back with authority the following year when they went 12–0, capping the year with a thrilling 17–14 win over the Nebraska Cornhuskers in the Fiesta Bowl, a game in which Kush's son, Danny, kicked three field goals, including the game winner. The Sun Devils finished second in both major polls, their highest ranking in a final poll.

A down year in 1976 saw the team fall to 4–7, but another comeback resulted the next year with a 9–3 mark. In that year's Fiesta Bowl, the Sun Devils lost a bowl game for the only time under Kush's leadership, with a 42–30 defeat to Penn State.

The Sun Devils moved to the Pacific-10 Conference for 1978. Kush's team didn't miss a beat, once again finishing 9–3 and defeating Rutgers in the Garden State Bowl. That win would be one of the final highlights of Kush's tenure as controversy and scandal the next year toppled him from his head coaching position.

Kush was very active off the field as well. Not long after becoming head coach, he helped lead the drive for the referendum that elevated Arizona State to university status. Years later, he recalled that officials at the University of Arizona were adamantly opposed to Arizona State becoming a university; they believed U of A should be the only university in the state–an argument that befuddled Kush, since as he put it, "These are supposed to be educated people."

Dismissal from Arizona State
In September 1979 former Sun Devil punter Kevin Rutledge filed a $1.1 million lawsuit against the school, accusing Kush and his staff of mental and physical harassment that forced him to transfer. The most dramatic charge was that Kush had punched Rutledge in the mouth after a bad punt in the October 28, 1978, game against the Washington Huskies. During the next few weeks, overzealous fans turned things ugly when the insurance office of Rutledge's father suffered a fire and the family's attorney received two death threats.

On October 13, 1979, Kush was fired as head coach for interfering with the school's internal investigation into Rutledge's allegations. Athletic director Fred Miller cited Kush's alleged attempts to pressure players and coaches into keeping quiet. The decision came just three hours before the team's home game against Washington. Kush was allowed to coach the game, with the Sun Devils pulling off an emotional 12–7 upset of the sixth-ranked Huskies, fueled by the angry crowd incensed by the decision. After the game ended, Kush was carried off the field by his team. The win gave him a 3–2 record on the season, but all three victories were later forfeited when it was determined that Arizona State had used ineligible players.

After nearly two years, Kush would be found not liable in the case, but remained absent from the sideline throughout 1980, the first time in more than 30 years that he had been away from the game. Litigation related to the Rutledge incident continued until 1986.

In 1980, the NCAA slapped Arizona State with two years' probation and a ban from postseason play in 1981 for multiple violations under Kush.

Future NFL players who played under Kush at Arizona State include Charley Taylor, Curley Culp, Danny White, Benny Malone, Mike Haynes, John Jefferson and Steve Holden. Baseball Hall of Famer Reggie Jackson also played a year of football at Arizona State for Kush on a football scholarship before switching to baseball.

Professional coaching career
Kush moved to the Canadian Football League the following year, serving as head coach of the Hamilton Tiger-Cats. In his only season with the team, he led his squad to an 11–4–1 mark and a berth in the CFL Eastern Conference championship game. Controversy followed him to the CFL, however, with Kush quarreling with some Ti-Cats players when he attempted to ban the common practice of taping shoes and ankles.

That performance helped Kush return to the United States when the Baltimore Colts hired him in 1982. During the strike-shortened season, the Colts had the dubious record of being the first NFL team since the 1976 Tampa Bay Buccaneers to not win a game during the season, finishing 0–8–1. John Elway's refusal to play for the Colts after they chose him first overall in the 1983 draft has been attributed, in part, to his desire not to play for Kush.

The Colts improved the following year with a 7–9 record, then moved to Indianapolis during the off-season, much to the disappointment of Kush who had wanted the team to negotiate a move to Phoenix. After just four wins in fifteen games in 1984, Kush quit on December 13, just days before the final game of the season. Citing a desire to be closer to friends and family, Kush accepted a three-year contract with the United States Football League's Arizona Outlaws.

However, the league folded in August 1986, with Kush then living off his personal services contract with Outlaws owner Bill Tatham by offering assistance to beginners in a local youth football league, joking, "I'm the highest-paid Pop Warner coach in the country." Kush also used his disciplinarian image to serve as director of the Arizona Boys Ranch, a facility used to reform juvenile offenders.

Life after coaching
In 1995, Kush was inducted into the College Football Hall of Fame. In part due to his work at the Arizona Boys Ranch, he was welcomed back to Arizona State as an informal goodwill ambassador a year later. On September 21, 1996, the school held Frank Kush Day and announced that the playing field at Sun Devil Stadium would be named "Frank Kush Field" in his honor. Reflecting Arizona State's rise to national prominence under Kush, the stadium's capacity more than doubled during his tenure, from 30,000 seats when it opened in 1958–the year Kush became head coach–to 70,311 seats when he was ousted. On the same night Arizona State went on to upset then #1 Nebraska in a dramatic 19–0 shutout, handing the Cornhuskers their first loss in over two seasons. In addition to the field honors, a bronze statue was placed outside the stadium.

On July 26, 2000, Kush was officially hired by Arizona State as an assistant to the athletic director, serving as a fund-raiser for the athletic department. He died on June 22, 2017, at the age of 88.

Head coaching record

College

NFL

Notes

References

External links
 

1929 births
2017 deaths
Arizona State Sun Devils football coaches
Baltimore Colts coaches
Hamilton Tiger-Cats coaches
Indianapolis Colts coaches
Michigan State Spartans football players
United States Football League coaches
College Football Hall of Fame inductees
United States Army officers
People from Windber, Pennsylvania
Players of American football from Pennsylvania
American people of Polish descent
Military personnel from Pennsylvania
Baltimore Colts head coaches
Indianapolis Colts head coaches